The 1978 United States Senate election in Colorado took place on November 7, 1978. Incumbent Democratic Senator Floyd Haskell ran for re-election to a second term, but was soundly defeated by Republican U.S. Representative William L. Armstrong.

Republican primary

Candidates
 William L. Armstrong, U.S. Representative from Littleton
 Jack Swigert, astronaut

Results

General election

Results

See also 
 1978 United States Senate elections

References 

1978
Colorado
United States Senate